Carex cubensis is a tussock-forming perennial in the family Cyperaceae. It is native to parts of Cuba and Haiti.

See also
 List of Carex species

References

cubensis
Plants described in 1926
Taxa named by Georg Kükenthal
Flora of Cuba
Flora of Haiti